Kisvárda Football Club  is a Hungarian football club located in Kisvárda. It currently plays in Nemzeti Bajnokság I. The team's colors are red and white.

History

Kisvárda FC, later known as Várda SE, was founded in 1911 as Kisvárdai Sport Egyesület (KSE). The officials of the village supported the new club by donating a pitch next to the market place. The financial support came from the merchants of the village, who helped a lot in the early stages of the club. In 1953, their present-day ground, the Várkerti sporttelep was built.

The club was reestablished on 26 October 1971.

Since the 2013–14 season, the official name of the club is Kisvárda-Master Good FC.

In the 2017-18 Nemzeti Bajnokság II, Kisvárda finished second and were promoted to the 2018-19 Nemzeti Bajnokság I.

On 21 July 2018, the first Nemzeti Bajnokság I match was played against 2017-18 Nemzeti Bajnokság I title-holders Videoton FC at the Pancho Aréna. The match ended with a 4–0 defeat.

On 30 July 2018, Elemér Kondás was sacked after two consecutive defeats in the 2018-19 Nemzeti Bajnokság I season. The next coach was László Dajka, whom Kisvárda stayed in the NB I for the next (2019/2020) season.

The end of the season Dajka left the club and his position received Vasile Miriuță.

Kisvárda were eliminated by Ferencváros in the round of 16 of the 2018–19 Magyar Kupa season on 1–3 aggregate.

On 6 February 2020, Tamás Bódog was appointed as the manager of the club. The club remained in the first division of the Hungarian League. However, he was sacked on 29 June 2020.

On 8 July 2020, Attila Supka, previously champions of the Nemzeti Bajnokság I with Debreceni VSC, was appointed as the manager of the club.

On 27 January 2021, Kisvárda beat Fehérvár FC for the first time in their history. The 2020-21 Nemzeti Bajnokság I match was won by 2-1. Originally, the match had to be played in autumn. However, it was postponed because Fehérvár played in the 2020-21 UEFA Europa League.

On May 5th 2022 Kisvarda beat Ujpest at Várkerti Stadion 2-1 and with this result secured themselves of a finish in 2nd or 3th domestically and therefore qualified for the 2022-23 Europa Conference League at the second qualifying round.

On 20 July 2022, Kisvárda played their first international match in the 2022-23 UEFA Europa Conference League. They entered the second round of the tournament against FC Kairat. The first leg was won by 1-0 Kisvárda at the Almaty Central Stadium, Almaty, Kazakhstan. The only goal was scored by Jasir Asani in the 82nd minute. In the second leg, Kisvárda beat Kairat 1-0 at Várkerti Stadion on 28 July 2022. The only goal was scored by Jasmin Mešanović in the 39th minute.

Stadium

The old grounds, Várkert Sportpálya, were next to the market place, on Anarcsi út (Anarcsi road). It was able to host up to 1,000 supporters. 
The current grounds, Várkert sporttelep, were established in 1953. The stadium is able to hold 2,000 people. The stadium's highest official attendance was 5,000, for a league match between Kisvárdai SE and Nyíregyházi VSSC on 1 April 1979.

The new stadium, Várkerti Stadion, was opened on 11 August 2018. The first match was played against Ferencváros in the 2018–19 Nemzeti Bajnokság I season. The match ended with a 2–0 victory for Ferencváros.

Honours
 Nemzeti Bajnokság I
 Runners-up (1): 2021–22
 Nemzeti Bajnokság II
 Runners-up (1): 2017–18
  Nemzeti Bajnokság III
 Winner (1): 2014-15

European record

As of match played 11 August 2022

Notes
 QR: Qualifying round

Players

Current squad
As of 3 February 2023

Players with multiple nationalities
   Viktor Hey
   Bohdan Melnyk

Managers 

   Vasile Miriuță (13 June 2019 – 8 October 2019)
  László Dajka (16 October 2019)
  Tamás Bódog (6 February 2020 – 29 June 2020)
  Attila Supka (8 July 2020 – 11 May 2021)
  João Janeiro (20 May 2021 – 10 November 2021)
  Gábor Erős (10 November 2021 – present)
  László Török (28 June 2022 – present)

Seasons

References

External links
 Official website 

 
Football clubs in Hungary
Association football clubs established in 1911
1911 establishments in Hungary
Sports clubs in Kisvárda